The 1955–56 Soviet Championship League season was the 10th season of the Soviet Championship League, the top level of ice hockey in the Soviet Union. Fifteen teams participated in the league, and CSK MO Moscow won the championship.

Standings

External links
Season on hockeystars.ru

Soviet League seasons
1955–56 in Soviet ice hockey
Soviet